The Patriarch of Moscow and all Rus', also known as the Patriarch of Moscow and all Russia, is the official title of the Bishop of Moscow who is the primate of the Russian Orthodox Church. It is often preceded by the honorific "His Holiness". While as the diocesan bishop of the Moscow diocese he has direct canonical authority over Moscow only, the Patriarch has a number of church-wide administrative powers within and in accordance with the charter of the Russian Orthodox Church.

The patriarchate was established in Moscow in 1589: the first patriarch was Job. Abolished in 1721 by Peter the Great, the patriarchate was restored on 28 October (10 November by Gregorian calendar) 1917, by decision of the All-Russian Local Council. Patriarch Kirill acceded to this position on 1 February 2009.

Etymology
Different variations of the title "Patriarch of Moscow and All Russia", "Patriarch of Moscow and all the Great, and Small, and White Russia" and others have been used. The modern form, "Patriarch of Moscow and all Rus'", was initially used in 1589 (when the see was elevated to patriarchate) through 1721 (when abolished by Peter the Great). The current version of the title was restored beginning in 1917 until suspended by Soviet authorities in 1925, and since being reinstated with the election of Metropolitan Sergius as patriarch in 1943.

History

Church reform of Tsar Peter I

Upon the death of Patriarch Adrian in 1700, Peter I did not permit the election of a new patriarch; after 20 years he established a Theological College, soon renamed the Holy Synod, which, as a public body, acted as the general church administration from 1721 to 1917. The emperor (to 2 March 1917) was "the highest judge of the assembly." In the subsequent period, the Synod of Church authorities in Russia was considered an institution of public administration.

Restoration
The Patriarch of the Russian Orthodox Church was restored by decision of the All-Russian Local Council on 28 October (11 November) 1917. The first patriarch elected after restoration was Patriarch Tikhon, Metropolitan of Moscow.

Selection
According to the Charter of the Russian Orthodox Church adopted in 2000, the tenure of a patriarch is for life, and the right to trial a deposed patriarch as well as the question of his retirement belong to the Council of Bishops.

Between terms, the Holy Synod of the Russian Orthodox Church elects the chair from among its permanent members of the locum tenens of the Patriarchal throne. "Not later than six months after the release of locum tenens of the patriarchal throne, and the Holy Synod of the local council ... shall convene to elect a new Patriarch of Moscow and All the Rus'."

The candidate for the patriarch must be a bishop of the Russian Orthodox Church, not younger than 40 years old, have a "higher theological education, the expertise of the diocesan administration".

The procedure for the election of the patriarch of the charter was not detailed, "place-holder establishes the procedure for electing the Holy Synod". In 2011, the Presidium of the Inter-Council Presence reviewed the draft document "The procedure and criteria for the election of the Patriarch of Moscow and All Russia" and decided to send it to the diocese for comment and publish the discussion. In the 20th century, Metropolitan Tikhon as patriarch was elected by lot from the three pre-approved for the Local Council candidates; between rigid state control over the affairs of the Russian Orthodox Church Sergius, Alexy I and Pimen were elected uncontested open vote on the approval of the government.

Alexius II was elected to the Local Council in 1990 by secret ballot in the first round, which was attended by three candidates approved by the Council of Bishops earlier (and local council had the right to add to the list of new candidates), and the second - the two candidates with the most votes in the first round.

Kirill I was elected on 27 January 2009 by the ROC Local Council (the 2009 Pomestny Sobor) as Patriarch of Moscow and All Rus' and Primate of the Russian Orthodox Church, with 508 votes out of 700. He was enthroned on 1 February 2009. The Patriarch enters the dignity during a special ceremony of enthronement, which is held a few days after the election.

See also

List of metropolitans and patriarchs of Moscow

References